Kiltamany is a village in Kenya.

References

Populated places in Kenya